Mirza Bašić was the defending champion but chose not to defend his title.

Marcelo Arévalo won the title after defeating Christopher Eubanks 6–4, 5–7, 7–6(7–4) in the final.

Seeds

Draw

Finals

Top half

Bottom half

References
Main Draw
Qualifying Draw

Jalisco Open - Singles
2018 Singles